Marjoie L. Kilkelly is an American politician from Maine. Kilkelly, a Democrat from Wiscasset, served from 1986 to 2002 in the Maine Legislature. Kilkelly was first elected to the Maine House of Representatives in November 1986. Re-elected every two years until 1994, Kilkelly won a seat in the Maine Senate. She served in the Senate until 2002.

Kilkelly was born in Bath, Maine. She earned both a B.S. and M.S. from New Hampshire College (now Southern New Hampshire University). Prior to serving in the Legislature, Kilkelly served on the Wiscasset Board of Selectmen.

References

Year of birth missing (living people)
Living people
People from Bath, Maine
People from Wiscasset, Maine
Democratic Party members of the Maine House of Representatives
Democratic Party Maine state senators
Women state legislators in Maine
Southern New Hampshire University alumni
21st-century American women